Elbow Reef is one of the last operational kerosene-fueled lighthouses in the world. This lighthouse was built in 1862 and became operational two years later, it is striped horizontally red and white.

The Elbow Reef Lighthouse is one of only three manual lighthouses left in the world. It has a weight mechanism that has to be hand cranked every several hours to maintain the sequence of five white flashes every 15 seconds. The lamp burns kerosene oil with a wick and mantle, at the rate of one gallon per night. The light is then focused as it passes through the optics of a first order Fresnel lens which floats on a bed of mercury.

The Elbow Reef Lighthouse Society, (a Bahamian non-profit) is responsible for keeping the site true to its historical past as a fully-working, non-automated, aid to navigation. Entrusted by the Ministry of Transportation and Local Government, (responsible for the Port Department and Maritime Affairs), The ERLS is the Elbow Reef Lightstation's infrastructural custodian, tasked with the oversight and ongoing preservation and restoration of the lighthouse and lightstation itself which comprises the lighthouse tower, two lighthouse keeper's quarters, six outbuildings, one gift shoppe and the wharf/dock.

Keepers

External links 
 Elbow Reef Lighthouse Society
 Elbow Reef Foundation
 Elbow Reef Lighthouse - The Abacos, video
 The Kerosene Keeper, video
 The Last Hand Cranked & Kerosene lit Lighthouse in the World. Peter Halil, 1998, video

References 

Lighthouses completed in 1862
Lighthouses in the Bahamas
1862 establishments in the British Empire